Chulki Nala is a river in Bidar District. It starts at Chowkiwadi in Basavakalyan taluka. It flows for 42 km in Bidar district and joins the river Karanja.
A Composite Dam is built near Mustapur village of  Basava Kalyana Taluk in Bidar District for Irrigation and Drinking water purposes. The dam has a storage capacity of 0.93 tmcft of water. The catchment area is 243.55 km2. It provides drinking water to Basavakalyan town.

Notes and references

Rivers of Karnataka
Tributaries of the Godavari River
Rivers of India